Broome railway station serves the villages of Broome and Aston on Clun in Shropshire, England. Trains that serve the station are operated by Transport for Wales.

History 

Originally opened as "Broom and Aston". In 1895 a wind engine was erected at the station for the London and North Western Railway by John Wallis Titt.

The line was double track and the station had two platforms until the 1960s, but the line was singled in 1965 and the station now has a single platform. The station buildings have since been demolished and replaced with a bus shelter structure.

Facilities
The station has no permanent buildings aside from a single timber waiting shelter, though it does have a CIS display and a timetable poster board. However, it has no public telephone or customer help point.  Step-free access is provided via a steep gravel ramp and steel gate from the entrance and car park, which has been proven to be unsuitable for wheelchair users.

Services 
There are five trains a day in each direction from Monday to Saturday (plus an extra northbound service to Shrewsbury for commuters on Mondays to Fridays), and two services on Sundays. This is a request stop and passengers intending to board must make a clear signal to the driver whilst alighting passengers must request the stop from the train guard.

See also 
 Rail transport in Shropshire

References

Bibliography
Body, G. (1983), PSL Field Guides - Railways of the Western Region, Patrick Stephens Ltd, Wellingborough,

External links 

Broome - Least Used Station In Shropshire, 2018 YouTube video about the station and its services

Railway stations in Shropshire
DfT Category F2 stations
Former London and North Western Railway stations
Railway stations in Great Britain opened in 1861
Heart of Wales Line
Railway stations served by Transport for Wales Rail
Railway request stops in Great Britain
1861 establishments in England